Thornbury Township is the name of some places in the U.S. state of Pennsylvania:

Thornbury Township, Chester County, Pennsylvania
Thornbury Township, Delaware County, Pennsylvania

Pennsylvania township disambiguation pages